Moezabad (also Romanized as Mo‘ezābād) is a village in Moezziyeh Rural District, Chatrud District, Kerman County, Kerman Province, Iran. At the 2006 census, its population was 683, in 170 families.

References 

Populated places in Kerman County